Lynn Camp Creek is a stream in Hart and LaRue counties, Kentucky, in the United States. It is a tributary of the Green River.

Lynn Camp Creek was named for Benjamin Lynn, an explorer who camped there. Lynn is also the namesake of Nolin River.

See also
List of rivers of Kentucky

References

Rivers of Hart County, Kentucky
Rivers of LaRue County, Kentucky
Rivers of Kentucky
Green River (Kentucky)